Lunella smaragda, common name the cat's eye snail,  is a species of sea snail, a marine gastropod mollusk in the family Turbinidae, the turban snails.

There has been little published on this species.

Description
This species has a green operculum. The size of the shell varies between 35 mm and 70 mm.

The depressed,  imperforate, solid shell has a heliciform shape. It is covered with a strong blackish cuticle, beneath which it is green. It is usually eroded at the apex and contains 4 to 5 whorls. The upper ones are spirally sulcate or carinate. The body whorl is large, flattened above, with incremental wrinkles and subobsolete spiral sulci. The large aperture is oblique, rounded, pearly white within. The outer lip is thin and black-edged. The arched columella has a pearly callus. The white umbilico-parietal area is excavated and concave.

The common name "cat's eye" for the synonym Turbo smaragdus is a reference to the attractively colored operculum of this species, which looks somewhat like an eye, and which is sometimes used for decorative purposes. The operculum is flat inside with four whorls. The nucleus is more than one-third the distance across the face. The outside is deep green except on the side of increment which is white. It is very minutely remotely granose.

Distribution
Lunella smaragda is an endemic species found both at the intertidal and low subtidal rocky shores and soft substrates (including seaweeds) of New Zealand. It is found around the North, South, and Stewart islands, on rocks between low and mid tide.

References

 Powell, A.W.B. (1979). New Zealand mollusca. Marine, land and freshwater shells. Collins Auckland. 
 Alf A. & Kreipl K. (2003). A Conchological Iconography: The Family Turbinidae, Subfamily Turbininae, Genus Turbo. Conchbooks, Hackenheim Germany.
 Spencer, H.G.; Marshall, B.A.; Maxwell, P.A.; Grant-Mackie, J.A.; Stilwell, J.D.; Willan, R.C.; Campbell, H.J.; Crampton, J.S.; Henderson, R.A.; Bradshaw, M.A.; Waterhouse, J.B.; Pojeta, J. Jr (2009). Phylum Mollusca: chitons, clams, tusk shells, snails, squids, and kin, in: Gordon, D.P. (Ed.) (2009). New Zealand inventory of biodiversity: 1. Kingdom Animalia: Radiata, Lophotrochozoa, Deuterostomia. pp. 161–254.

External links
 The Taiwan malacofauna database : Lunella smaragdus
 NABIS : Annual Distribution of the cat's eye
 image of aperture and operculum of a living specimen and more information
 Image from collection of the Museum of New Zealand Te Papa Tongarewa
 

smaragda
Gastropods of New Zealand
Gastropods described in 1791
Taxa named by Johann Friedrich Gmelin
Endemic molluscs of New Zealand
Endemic fauna of New Zealand